Georgi Hristov may refer to:

Bulgarian footballers
 Georgi Hristov (footballer, born 1985), forward for Tampa Bay Rowdies
 Georgi Hristov (footballer, born February 1978), goalkeeper for Neftochimic Burgas
 Georgi Hristov (footballer, born August 1978), midfielder for Etar

Others
 Ǵorǵi Hristov (1976), Macedonian footballer